Hugh XIII of Lusignan, Hugh VIII of La Marche or Hugh IV of Angoulême (25 June 1259 – 1 November 1303 in Angoulême) succeeded his father Hugh XII as Seigneur de Lusignan, Count of La Marche and Count of Angoulême in 1270.

He married at Pau on 1 July 1276 Beatrix de Bourgogne, Dame de Grignon ( 1260 – Cognac, June 1328/31 May 1329 and buried at Angoulême), daughter of Hugh IV, Duke of Burgundy and second wife Beatrice of Champagne. They had no issue.

1259 births
1303 deaths
Counts of Angoulême
Counts of La Marche
House of Lusignan
13th-century French people